Vilém Alois Maria August Goppold Jr. (15 August 1893 – 7 July 1945) was a Bohemian épée, foil and sabre fencer. He competed in three events at the 1912 Summer Olympics.

References

External links
 

1893 births
1945 deaths
Czech male épée fencers
Olympic fencers of Bohemia
Fencers at the 1912 Summer Olympics
Czech male foil fencers
Czech male sabre fencers
Sportspeople from Prague